Jonathan Dewayne "Fast Freddie" Smith (born November 28, 1981 in Argyle, Georgia) is a free agent wide receiver in the National Football League. Smith was drafted by the Buffalo Bills in the seventh round with the 214th overall pick in the 2004 NFL Draft.

College career
Smith was a successful college wide receiver and kick returner at Georgia Tech from 2001 to 2003.  While at Georgia Tech, he majored in Management. In four years, Smith had over 2,931 all-purpose yards and 15 all-purpose touchdowns. He earned the nickname Fast Freddie because his short-strided running style resembled Fred Flintstone when driving the Flintmobile.

Professional career
Smith was drafted in the 7th round of the 2004 NFL Draft by the Buffalo Bills as the 214th overall pick. He was the backup kick and punt returner for the Buffalo Bills in 2005 and had over 400 all-purpose yards in his rookie season.

The Bills released Smith at the end of the 2006 preseason. He was immediately claimed off waivers by the New England Patriots, who then released him before the opening game. On September 12, 2006, the Patriots re-signed Smith. On October 5, 2006, the Patriots released Smith from their roster. On January 4, 2007, Smith was signed to the Patriots' 2007 roster. He was released again on July 19, 2007, and claimed by the Bills off waivers on July 23.

References

1981 births
Living people
American football wide receivers
American football return specialists
Georgia Tech Yellow Jackets football players
Buffalo Bills players
New England Patriots players
People from Clinch County, Georgia
Players of American football from Georgia (U.S. state)